The A110 autoroute is a proposed motorway in central France.  It will connect Ablis or Chartres and Sorigny south of Tours.

References

External links
 A110 Motorway in Saratlas

A110